The Vienna School of History is an influential school of historical thinking based at the University of Vienna. It is closely associated with Reinhard Wenskus, Herwig Wolfram and Walter Pohl. Partly drawing upon ideas from sociology and critical theory, scholars of the Vienna School have utilized the concept of ethnogenesis to reassess the notion of ethnicity as it applies to historical groups of peoples such as the Germanic tribes. Focusing on Late Antiquity and the Early Middle Ages, the Vienna School has a large publishing output, and has had a major influence on the modern analysis of barbarian identity.

Theories
The origins of the Vienna School of History can be traced to the works of the German historian Reinhard Wenskus. During the 1960s, there was as reaction against previous scholarship on Germanic tribes. Drawing upon studies on modern tribes, Wenskus posited that the Germanic tribes of antiquity did not constitute distinct ethnicities, but were rather diverse alliances led by a dominant elite continuing "core-traditions". Wenskus argued that members of the Germanic tribes were not actually related to each other by kin; this was rather a figment of their own imagination. Though Wenskus' pioneering book has been immensely influential, "it is not an easy read".  

More recent scholars associated with Wenskus in the Vienna School are Herwig Wolfram and Walter Pohl. The Vienna School is associated with the European Science Foundation and the Transformation of the Roman World project. The support given by the European Science Foundation to this project has been given with the ambitious aim of correcting previous theories on the fall of the Western Roman Empire, particularly through downplaying the role ethnic identity, migration and imperial decline played in this process. According to certain observers, this support is politically aimed at furthering European integration.

Drawing on theories drawn from sociology and critical theory, scholars of the Vienna School introduced the concept of ethnogenesis to deconstruct the ethnicity of Germanic tribes, proceeding from a "strongly politicized concept of ethnicity" and emphasizing the situationality of tribal ethnicities centered around a core of tradition. These scholars also emphasize that the influence of Germanic history extends beyond northern and western Europe. Wolfram points out the contribution of Germanic tribes to the histories of regions such as the Balkans and southern Europe in general, extending even to North Africa, in order to counter the view that Germanic history ought to be identified only with the Germans. 

The ethnogenesis theories of the Vienna School have initiated a "revolution in historical approaches to early medieval ethnicity" and "overturned the foundations of earlier research into the ethnic groups of the early medieval period". It has since become the model with which "barbarian" ethnicity is analyzed. They have had an immense publication output. English-language scholars that have been influenced by the Vienna School include Patrick J. Geary, Ian N. Wood and Patrick Amory. However, Geary, Wood and Pohl approach the theories in "a more flexible manner" than Wenskus and Wolfram. Guy Halsall notes the favorable effect of these approaches on the study of late antique ethnicity, pointing out that Pohl's views on the mutability of ethnic identity run counter to prewar notions of ethnic essentialism which survive in some other modern scholarship.

Criticism
Pohl's theories of the Germanic tribes have been criticized by Wolf Liebeschuetz as "extraordinarily one-sided" and a form of ideological "dogmatism" evincing "a closed mind". He further suggests that according to the Vienna School view represented by Pohl, the Germanic tribes had no institutions or values of their own, and therefore made no contribution to medieval Europe. 

Shami Ghosh accuses Vienna School scholars of occasionally resorting to "rather dubious sorts of evidence" to push their interpretation of the sources in a particular manner, while conceding that this school has contributed greatly to our understanding of late antique and early medieval history.

Toronto School
The Vienna School has been contrasted with the Toronto School, of whom Walter Goffart is a leading member. Like the Vienna School, members Toronto School have received "a great boost" from the European Science Foundation, which some critics claim reflects a "multicultural" and "relativist" political agenda on part of the European Union. While the Vienna School considers Old Norse literature and works such as Getica by Jordanes to be of some value, this is completely rejected by the Toronto School. They consider these works to be artificial constructions entirely devoid from oral tradition. While neither of the schools are entirely homogeneous in their approach, discussions between the two schools are characterized by an unusually intense passion and highly polemic dialogue.

In 2002, On Barbarian Identity, a work by scholars associated with the Toronto School and edited by Andrew Gillett, was published. In this work, the Vienna School was accused of being composed of "crypto-nationalists", and of enforcing "a new historical orthodoxy". These critics deny that the various Germanic-speaking peoples had a single set of core traditions. They consider Old Norse literature, Roman literature and other primary sources unreliable for the study of Germanic history and culture. Previous scholarship on Germanic tribes is considered by them to be politically unreliable. In their view, Germanic culture was a creation of the Roman Empire. Wolf Liebeschuetz has criticized these theories as "very strongly ideological, deriving from the rejection of nationalism and the acceptance of multiculturalism", and "flawed because they depend on a dogmatic and selective use of the evidence". Liebeschuetz contends that the proponents of these theories are motivated by a political agenda, which revolves around pan-European identity.

Oxford historians
In recent years, scholars associated with University of Oxford have been leading what Guy Halsall describes as a "counter-revisionist offensive" against the more "subtle ways of thinking" of the Vienna School and Toronto School.  Historian Peter Heather is considered the senior figure among them. Heather disagrees with both the core-tradition theory pioneered by the Vienna School, and the theories of the Toronto School. Heather contends that it was a freemen class between slaves and nobles who constituted the backbone of Germanic tribes, and that the ethnic identity of tribes such as the Goths was stable for centuries, being held together by these freemen. He traces the Fall of the Western Roman Empire to external migration triggered by the Huns in the late 4th century. 

Proposals that the barbarian armies who took over parts of the western empire had been managed by, and absorbed into, the Western Roman Empire, according to policies which had been used for centuries, have been described by Heather as something which "smells more of wishful thinking than likely reality". He argues in a more traditional way that the changes were due to unprecedented violence from outside the Roman empire, which had otherwise been peaceful and highly effective. Like Liebeschuetz, Heather claims that such theories have been boosted through "huge" support from the European Science Foundation, which, in order to advance a pan-European ideal, has sought to minimize the importance of migration and ethnic identity in the Migration Period. Heather notes that despite such tremendous efforts, these "revisionist" theories are yet to be generally accepted.

Heather has been criticized for his views by Michael Kulikowski, a member of the Toronto School, who accuses him of neo-romanticism and of wishing "to revive a biological approach to ethnicity". Halsall has accused Heather and his associates of "bizarre reasoning" and of purveying a "deeply irresponsible history". According to Halsall, the Oxford historians have been responsible for "an academic counter-revolution" of wide importance, and accuses them of carelessly providing assistance to the rise of "far-right extremists".

Notes

References

Sources

 
 
 
 
 
 
 
 
 
 
 
 

Critical theory
Germanic studies
Historical revisionism
Historical schools
Sociological theories
University of Vienna